Huang Qian (born July 18, 1986) is a Chinese chess player who holds the title of Woman Grandmaster (WGM). She won the Chinese Women's Chess Championship in 2012 and the Asian Women's Chess Championship in 2013. Huang competed in the Women's World Chess Championship in 2001, 2004, 2010, 2012, 2015 and 2017.

Career 
Huang was a member of the gold medal-winning Chinese team at the 2004 Women's Chess Olympiad in Calvià.
In 2007, along with Zhao Xue, Hou Yifan, Ruan Lufei and Shen Yang, she also won with the Chinese team the first Women's World Team Chess Championship in Yekaterinburg. She scored of 4/4 (despite this 100% result she did not win reserve board prize due to the limited number of games played).

Huang was awarded the Woman Grandmaster title in March 2008. Her three norms required for the title were achieved at:

 36th Chess Olympiad (Women) in Calvià, Spain October 14–31, 2004; score 7.5/10
 China Women's Individual Championship Group A in Chongqing, China June 6–19, 2007; score 6.5/10
 12th Asian Women Individual Championship in Tehran, Iran September 3–11, 2007; score 5.5/9

In 2013, she won the Zhonghai Huashan Cup for Women Stars, a rapidplay women's round-robin tournament held in Huayin, on tiebreak over Viktorija Cmilyte with a score of 4½/7, half point ahead of Tatiana Kosintseva and Women's World Champion Anna Ushenina. Huang Qian played in the Women World Rapid Championship in Riyadh 2017 and realised her best results with the black pieces (2 wins, 2 draws). In 2019, she won the Yinzhou Cup in Ningbo, China for women.

Huang Qian plays for China Mobile Group Chongqing Company Ltd chess club in the China Chess League (CCL).

Personal life
Huang Qian is married to chess grandmaster Bu Xiangzhi.

References

External links

1986 births
Living people
Chess woman grandmasters
Chinese female chess players
Chess Olympiad competitors
Asian Games medalists in chess
Chess players at the 2010 Asian Games
Asian Games gold medalists for China
Medalists at the 2010 Asian Games
Universiade medalists in chess
Chess players from Chongqing
Universiade bronze medalists for China
Medalists at the 2011 Summer Universiade